Remy Siemsen (born 10 November 1999) is an Australian soccer player who currently plays for Leicester City in the English Women's Super League. She has represented Australia on the under-20 national team. Following her debut season in the W-League at the age of 16, she was named W-League Young Footballer of the Year.

Early life
Siemsen attended Oxford Falls Grammar School. She played junior football for BTH Raiders. Siemsen was selected for the Australian School Girls Squad and  represented Football NSW at the National Training Centre (NTC) Challenge. At age 16, she was named Football NSW NPL Women's Player of the Year.

Club career

Sydney FC (2016–2018)
Siemsen made her debut for Sydney FC during the 2016–17 season at the age of 16.  Sydney finished in third place during the regular season with a  record and advanced to the semi-finals where they were eliminated by Perth Glory. Siemsen finished her first season with six goals, ranking as the club's top scorer. She was named the league's Young Footballer of the Year in May 2017. She was named the 2016 Junior Sports Star by the Manly Daily.

Returning to Sydney for the 2017–18 season, Siemsen scored the game-winning goal coming off the bench as a substitute against former champions Melbourne City on 18 November. Siemsen finished off the 2017–18 season with 4 goals and a grand final finish with her Sydney FC team.

California Storm (2018)
In April 2018, Siemsen joined Women's Premier Soccer League (WPSL) side California Storm on a short-term contract. In her first game as a Storm player, she scored a brace in a 3–2 loss to Fresno FC. She was named WPSL West Region Player of the Week in Week 3 after tallying two goals and one assist on the road against Primero de Mayo. On 23 June, she scored a hat-trick in a 4–1 victory against the MVLA Wolves. She finished the season with 9 goals and 5 assists in 8 appearances.

Western Sydney Wanderers (2018–2019)
In September 2018, Siemsen signed with Western Sydney Wanderers.

Sydney FC (2019–2022)
In the 2019 off-season, Siemsen returned to Sydney FC. She marked he return during the first match of the 2019–20 season by scoring a brace in a 3–0 victory over Melbourne Victory. Following that performance and her performance in Sydney FC's 1–0 victory over Adelaide United the following week, she was named the Player of the Month for November. Siemsen scored seven goals during the season and won the W-League Golden Boot in a four-way tie with foreign players Morgan Andrews, Natasha Dowie, and Kristen Hamilton. In August 2020, Siemsen re-signed with Sydney FC ahead of the 2020–21 W-League season. Over the season, Siemsen scored another seven goals, winning Sydney FC's Golden Boot for the third time, and in August 2021 re-signed with the club for the 2021–22 A-League Women season.

AIK (2022)
In March 2022, Siemsen joined a European club for the first time, signing with Swedish club AIK.

Sydney FC (2022)
In November 2022, after the 2022–23 A-League Women had already started, Siemsen returned to Sydney FC following the conclusion of the 2022 Damallsvenskan. Over the course of a month, Siemsen scored two goals in four months, after which she transferred to a European club on a domestic record transfer fee.

Leicester City (2023–)
A couple of weeks after Sydney FC announced her departure, it was revealed that Siemsen had signed with English Women's Super League club Leicester City.

International career
Siemsen has represented Australia on the under-20 national team and competed at the 2017 AFC U-19 Women's Championship qualification tournament in 2016.  She scored ten goals in two games during the qualifying tournament, seven against the Northern Mariana Islands and three against Jordan. She was subsequently named player of the tournament. During the 2017 AFC U-19 Women's Championship, Siemsen scored a goal against Vietnam, Japan and South Korea in consecutive games to advance Australia to the semi-finals for the first time in 11 years.

Siemsen made her full international debut for Australia against Brazil in October 2021.

Honours

Individual
 Football NSW NPL Women's Player of the Year: 2016
 W-League Young Footballer of the Year: 2016
 PFA Young Women's Footballer of the Year nominee: 2017
 Football NSW NPL Women's Player of the year: 2017 
 Football NSW NPL Player of the Final: 2017

References

External links

 Remy Siemsen at Sydney FC
 Remy Siemsen at the Women's Premier Soccer League (WPSL)
 

1999 births
Living people
Australian women's soccer players
Women's association football forwards
Sydney FC (A-League Women) players
California Storm players
AIK Fotboll (women) players
Leicester City W.F.C. players
A-League Women players
Women's Premier Soccer League players
Damallsvenskan players
Australian expatriate sportspeople in the United States
Expatriate women's soccer players in the United States
Australia women's international soccer players
Soccer players from Sydney
Australian expatriate sportspeople in Sweden
Expatriate women's footballers in Sweden
Australian expatriate women's soccer players
Sportswomen from New South Wales
Australian expatriate sportspeople in England
Expatriate women's footballers in England